Gastrioceratoidea is one of 17 superfamilies in the  suborder Goniatitina, ammonoid cephalopods from the Late Paleozoic.

Shells are variable in form with a broad whorl section and wide umbilicus. Early whorls are commonly evolute. Shells may be smooth or sculptured with transverse striae (fine grooves) and constrictions. The ventral lobe of the suture is  double pronged, prongs being relatively wide but sides not diverging. The median saddle is half as high or more so than the height of the entire ventral lobe. The first lateral saddle, which lies next to the ventral lobe is either rounded or subacute.

Gastrioceratoideae lived during the middle part of the Carboniferous, from the latest Mississippian to the middle of the Pennsylvanian  lasting for some eight million years. Greatest generic diversity occurred during the early Pennsylvanian.

References

 Miller, Furnish, and Schindewolf, 1957, Paleozoic Ammonoidea, Treatise on Invertebrate Paleontology, Part L. Geological Society of America and University of Kansas Press.
 Saunders, Work, and Nikoleva 1999. Evolution of Complexity in Paleozoic Ammonoid Sutures, Supplementary material. Science 22 October 1999: Vol. 286 no. 5440 pp. 760–763. Abstract  
 Gastrioceratatoidea in GONIAT online 

 
Goniatitida superfamilies
Goniatitina